Robert R. Gray (born ) was a teacher and state legislator in North Carolina. He served in the North Carolina House and Senate. He attended Saint Augustine College in Raleigh.

In 1883 when he was 28 years old, he represented Edgecombe County in the North Carolina Senate. He was African American. He lived in Tarboro, North Carolina.

See also

 African-American officeholders during and following the Reconstruction era

References

Year of birth missing (living people)
Year of birth missing
Year of death missing
African-American state legislators in North Carolina
People from Edgecombe County, North Carolina
19th-century African-American politicians
Members of the North Carolina House of Representatives
North Carolina state senators
Schoolteachers from North Carolina
African-American schoolteachers
St. Augustine's University (North Carolina) alumni
19th-century African-American educators
19th-century American politicians
19th-century American educators